Saint Rose is an unincorporated community located in the town of Smelser, Grant County, Wisconsin, United States.

History
A post office called Saint Rose was in operation from 1856 until 1882. The community took its name from Saint Rose catholic church.

Notes

Unincorporated communities in Grant County, Wisconsin
Unincorporated communities in Wisconsin